Alasdair Roberts may refer to:
 Alasdair Roberts (academic) (born 1961), Canadian political scientist
 Alasdair Roberts (musician) (born 1977), Scottish singer-songwriter